Hyperthaema sanguineata is a moth of the subfamily Arctiinae. It was described by Francis Walker in 1865. It is found in Colombia, Ecuador, Peru and Bolivia.

References

 

Phaegopterina
Moths described in 1865